Elias V may refer to:

Count Elias V of Périgord (1136–1205)
Eliya V, patriarch of the Church of the East (1502–1504)